The Beauty Market is a 1919 American drama film directed by Colin Campbell and written by Margery Land May. The film stars Katherine MacDonald, Roy Stewart, Kathleen Kirkham, Wedgwood Nowell, Winter Hall, and Robert Brower. The film was released on December 1, 1919, by First National Exhibitors' Circuit. There are no known archival holdings of the film, so it is presumably a lost film.

Plot

Cast      
Katherine MacDonald as Amelie Thorndike
Roy Stewart as Capt. Kenneth Laird
Kathleen Kirkham as Christine Appleby
Wedgwood Nowell as Hobie Flagg
Winter Hall as Ashburton Gaylord
Robert Brower as Amelia's Uncle Issacs

References

External links

 

1919 films
1910s English-language films
Silent American drama films
1919 drama films
First National Pictures films
Films directed by Colin Campbell
American silent feature films
American black-and-white films
1910s American films